Johny Kirsch (born 26 November 1944) is a Luxembourgian footballer. He played in eight matches for the Luxembourg national football team from 1964 to 1973.

References

1944 births
Living people
Luxembourgian footballers
Luxembourg international footballers
Place of birth missing (living people)
Association footballers not categorized by position